George Herman Kiick (September 5, 1917 – March 21, 2002) was an American football fullback who played two seasons with the Pittsburgh Steelers of the NFL. He played college football at Bucknell University for the Bucknell Bison football team.  His son Jim Kiick was also a professional running back, primarily for the Miami Dolphins. His granddaughter Allie Kiick is a professional tennis player.

References

1917 births
2002 deaths
American football fullbacks
Players of American football from Pennsylvania
People from Hanover, Pennsylvania
Pittsburgh Steelers players
Bucknell Bison football players